Huaxi Township is a township under the administration of Bazhou District, Bazhong, Sichuan, China. , it has one residential community and 11 villages under its administration.

References 

Township-level divisions of Sichuan
Bazhong